The 1955–56 NBA season was the Celtics' tenth season in the NBA. This was the last time the Celtics failed to advance to the NBA Finals until 1966–67.

Regular season

x = clinched playoff spot

Record vs. opponents

Game log

Playoffs

|- align="center" bgcolor="#ccffcc"
| 1
| March 17
| Syracuse
| W 110–93
| Bob Cousy (29)
| —
| Bob Cousy (9)
| Boston Garden
| 1–0
|- align="center" bgcolor="#ffcccc"
| 2
| March 19
| @ Syracuse
| L 98–101
| Bob Cousy (28)
| Arnie Risen (17)
| Bob Cousy (10)
| Onondaga War Memorial
| 1–1
|- align="center" bgcolor="#ffcccc"
| 3
| March 21
| Syracuse
| L 97–102
| Bill Sharman (24)
| Arnie Risen (15)
| Bob Cousy (7)
| Boston Garden
| 1–2
|-

Awards and records
 Bob Cousy, All-NBA First Team
 Bill Sharman, All-NBA First Team

References

Boston Celtics seasons
Boston Celtics
Boston Celtics
Boston Celtics
1950s in Boston